Connor Boyle (born 19 February 2000) is a Scottish rugby union player for Edinburgh Rugby in the United Rugby Championship. Boyle's primary position is flanker.

Rugby Union career

Professional career

Boyle came through the Edinburgh academy, signing his first professional contract in July 2020. He made his debut for Edinburgh in Round 3 of the 2020–21 Pro14 against Connacht.

External links
itsrugby Profile

References

2000 births
Living people
Edinburgh Rugby players
Rugby union flankers
Rugby union players from Livingston, West Lothian
Scottish rugby union players